opened in Chūō-ku, Osaka, Japan, in 1987.

See also
 Fujita Art Museum
 Masaki Art Museum
 Kubosō Memorial Museum of Arts, Izumi

References

External links
  Yuki Museum of Art

Art museums and galleries in Osaka
Art museums established in 1987
1987 establishments in Japan
Chūō-ku, Osaka